Harry Mason may refer to:

 Harry C. Mason (1867–1901), American politician from Ohio
 Harry H. Mason (1873–1946), U.S. Representative from Illinois
 Harry Mason (boxer) (1903–1977), British lightweight/welterweight boxer
 Harry Mason (American football), early professional football player for the Syracuse Athletic Club and the Watertown Red & Black
 Harry Mason (Coronation Street), a character from the soap opera Coronation Street
 Harry Mason (Silent Hill), a playable character from the video game Silent Hill

See also
Henry Mason (disambiguation)
Hal Mason (disambiguation)
Harold Mason (disambiguation)